Parsi Gymkhana may mean:

 Parsi Gymkhana (Marine Drive): A gymkhana located at Marine Drive in Mumbai
 Parsi Gymkhana (Dadar): A gymkhana located at Dadar in Mumbai
 Parsi Gymkhana, Pune: A gymkhana in Pune
 Parsi Gymkhana, Mahabaleshwar: A gymkhana in Mahabaleshwar
 Parsi Gymkhana, Nagpur: A gymkhana in Nagpur